San Marcello is a comune (municipality) in the Province of Ancona in the Italian region Marche, located about  west of Ancona.

San Marcello borders the following municipalities: Belvedere Ostrense, Jesi, Maiolati Spontini, Monsano, Monte San Vito, Morro d'Alba.

Founded in 1234 by a community of people from Jesi, it still has a well preserved line of walls. It is interesting to visit the Renaissance Palazzo Marcelli, the parish church, the Ferrari theatre, the Saint Mary church.

The castle is surrounded by a beautiful hilly landscape particularly renown for olive trees and vineyards.

References

Cities and towns in the Marche
Populated places established in the 1230s
1234 establishments in Europe
13th-century establishments in Italy